Patricia A. Frazier is an American psychology professor who researches the application of social psychological theory and research to problems of concern to counseling psychologists. In particular, coping with stressful or traumatic life events, and developing innovative interventions. She heads the Stress and Trauma Lab at the University of Minnesota.

Educational Background
Ph.D.: University of Minnesota, 1988.

Specialties
|coping strategies
|postrape recovery
|reactions to victimization, trauma
|online interventions
|stress
|victims and violence
|College Student Mental Health

References

External links

Year of birth missing (living people)
Living people
American women psychologists
21st-century American psychologists
University of Minnesota alumni
21st-century American women